Goregaon is a village in Parner taluka in Ahmednagar district of state of Maharashtra, India.

Religion
The population  in the village is mostly Hindu with few  Muslim families .

Economy
The majority of the population has farming as their primary occupation.
Many of the people are primary teachers as well as in defense. Some are in politics.
Goregoan is tourist place, Goreshwar Mandir, Hajrat Abdulshah 
Noorashah dargah, Water Fall, khandoba temple.

See also
 Parner taluka
 Villages in Parner taluka

References 

Villages in Parner taluka
Villages in Ahmednagar district